Group A of the 2001 FIFA Confederations Cup took place between 30 May and 3 June 2001. France won the group, and advanced to the knockout stage, along with group runners-up Australia. South Korea and Mexico failed to advance.

Standings

Results

France v South Korea

Mexico v Australia

Australia v France

South Korea v Mexico

France v Mexico

South Korea v Australia

References

A
2000–01 in French football
2000–01 in Mexican football
2001 in South Korean football
2001 in Australian soccer